Dromintee St Patrick's Gaelic Athletic Club is a GAA club in Armagh. It represents the Dromintee and Jonesborough parish on the southern border of County Armagh. Dromintee plays Gaelic football and is currently in the Armagh Senior Football Championship.

History
Dromintee Gaelic Football Club was established in 1886 or 1887, becoming the first Armagh club to affiliate to the GAA. The Dundalk Democrat reported a match played on 27 February 1887 between Dromintee and Kilcurry (County Louth). The Dromintee team, which may have been known as Gap of the North, seems to have disappeared within a year.

In the 1920s Gaelic games underwent a revival, with the formation in the parish of Jonesboro Border Rangers GAC. The high point of this club's existence was winning the Armagh Junior Football Championship in 1934, defeating High Moss by 1-7 to 2-2. The Rangers broke up in 1937 but were again active in 1941–1946. (In the interim, a club called Faughil Emmets operated in the parish in 1940–41.)

The present club, Dromintee St Patrick's, was founded in 1952, when it won the South Armagh League. Dromintee won the South Armagh Junior Championship in 1954 and the Armagh Junior League in 1963.

Dromintee's first victory in a county championship final was in 1966, when it secured the Junior title. The 1970s were difficult for the club, but its fortunes revived with League victories in 1983 (Division 4) and 1984 (Div. 3). It won the JFC again in 1984, and was promoted to the Intermediate ranks.

In 1985, Dromintee lost the Intermediate football final to Derrynoose. The club opened its new grounds, Páirc Uí Luachra agus Mhic Cathmhaoil (Lochrie and Campbell Park), in 1988. In 1989, it secured its first IFC title, defeating Mullaghbawn 0-10 to 0-7. Another IFC title came in 1996, when Dromintee beat Middletown Eoghan Rua by 1-9 to 0-6.

The club did not reach a Senior county final until 2001, when it lost to Crossmaglen Rangers. Remarkably, it faced Crossmaglen again in the 2002, 2003, 2005 and 2010 finals, losing on each occasion.

Dromintee was the home of a former GAA President, Pádraig MacNamee. He served as President from 1938 to 1943 as a representative of Antrim.

Current Football Squad 2022
1. Dylan McGahon
2. Ronan Quinn (c)
3. Peter Campbell
4. Cathal O’Neill
5. Adam Markey
6. Paul Martin
7. Ryan Gaskin
8. Darren McKenna
9. Gareth Kilgallon
10. Niall Quinn
11. Shea McArdle
12. Liam Fearon
13. Oran Loughran
14. Cathal McKenna
15. Jack McArdle
Subs used
17. Aaron Boyle
21. Ryan Hughes
Team vs Maghery Armagh Senior Football League Division 1A

Hurling and camogie
Hurling and camogie teams were formed in 1987, but the former was short-lived. The camogie team has won two county championships and several league titles.

Notable players/former players
Aidan O'Rourke, Armagh county player 2001–09, All Star, former Louth manager
Kevin Dyas, Armagh county player and Australian rules footballer

Honours
Armagh Junior Football Championship (2 as present club)
1934 (Jonesboro Border Rangers)
1966, 1984
Armagh Intermediate Football Championship (2)
1989, 1996
Armagh Under-21 Football Championship (1)
2003
Armagh Junior Camogie Championship (1)
1994
Armagh Intermediate Camogie Championship (1)
1996
Armagh Senior Football League A (1)
2020/2021

References

External links 
Club website

Gaelic games clubs in County Armagh
Gaelic football clubs in County Armagh